Heriknaz (also, Höriknaz and Eriknaz) is a village in the Gadabay Rayon of Azerbaijan.  The village forms a part of the municipality of Poladlı.

Notable natives 

 Mehdi Guliyev — Hero of the Soviet Union.

References 

Populated places in Gadabay District